The 1961 West Virginia Mountaineers football team represented West Virginia University as a member of the Southern Conference (SoCon) during the 1961 NCAA University Division football season. Led by second-year head coach Gene Corum, the Mountaineers compiled an overall record of 4–6 with a mark of 2–1 in conference play, tying for third place in the SoCon.

Schedule

References

West Virginia
West Virginia Mountaineers football seasons
West Virginia Mountaineers football